Roberto David Pietri Chiossone (better known as Robertino Pietri, born 6 May, 1985) is a Venezuelan professional motorcycle racer.

Motorcycle racing career
Born in Puerto la Cruz, Venezuela, Pietri has competed in the 2007 Monza Superbike World Championship round and in two Moto2 World Championship seasons, as well as in the AMA Superbike, Superstock and Daytona SportBike championships. He is son of a former professional motorcycle racer, Roberto Pietri.

Career statistics

Superbike World Championship

Races by year
(key)

Grand Prix motorcycle racing

By season

Races by year
(key)

References

External links

Living people
1985 births
People from Puerto la Cruz
Venezuelan motorcycle racers
Moto2 World Championship riders
Superbike World Championship riders
AMA Superbike Championship riders